Rule of thirds may refer to:
Rule of thirds (diving)
Rule of thirds, a photography rule of thumb
Rule of thirds (tidal current rate)